Raúl García (born 9 April 1930) is a Cuban former swimmer. He competed in the men's 100 metre freestyle at the 1948 Summer Olympics.

References

External links
 

1930 births
Living people
Cuban male freestyle swimmers
Olympic swimmers of Cuba
Swimmers at the 1948 Summer Olympics
Place of birth missing (living people)
20th-century Cuban people
21st-century Cuban people